Darlings is a 2022 Indian Hindi-language dark comedy film co-written and directed by Jasmeet K. Reen, in her directorial debut, from a screenplay by Parveez Sheikh, and produced by  Alia Bhatt, Gauri khan (in her debut production), and Gaurav Verma under the banners Red Chillies Entertainment and Eternal Sunshine Productions. The film stars Alia Bhatt, Shefali Shah, Vijay Varma and Roshan Mathew in the lead roles.

It was released on Netflix, on 5 August 2022. Darlings received positive reviews from the critics. The film received more than 10 million watching hours in its opening weekend, highest for any non-English language original film worldwide.

Plot
Hamza Shaikh is an alcoholic who beats his wife Badrunissa "Badru" Shaikh (née Ansari) after drinking, every night for 3 years of their love marriage. Badru finds many ways to make him quit drinking, one of which is insisting Hamza have a child. Hamza is constantly in a tiff with the rest of the society members for a renovation of the chawl they reside in. Badru attends one of the meetings in which the final decision on the renovation of the building is to be taken. Badru attends the meeting, despite Hamza asking her not to, and is beaten up again. Zulfi, who does odd jobs around the chawl, often visits Badru and her mother Shamshunissa "Shamshu" Ansari. He is aware of the torture Badru suffers from each day. He files a complaint against Hamza for physical abuse. Hamza is arrested but promises Badru he will quit drinking once they have a child. Badru gets Hamza out of jail and suffers more abuse at the hands of Hamza, who doesn't change. Hamza then finds out that his liver is cirrhosed and he needs to quit drinking or he'll die. That evening, upon returning home, Hamza learns that Badru is pregnant with their child, and he pretends to quit drinking to keep his promise. In reality, he quit drinking due to cirrhosis and not because of Badru's pregnancy. Meanwhile, Hamza is hell-bent on knowing who filed the complaint against him. He eventually finds out that Zulfi did it and that Badru knew about it the whole time. Despite knowing that Badru is pregnant, Hamza still hits her, suspicious that Badru and Zulfi are having an affair. He is suspicious that the child borne by Badru is not his. Hamza beats Badru brutally and pushes her down a flight of stairs, which results in her suffering a miscarriage. On this day Hamza was not under the influence of any alcohol, this portrayed the real demon in him. After being hospitalized and losing her child, Badru vows to treat Hamza just the way he treated her.

She comes home and feeds him sleeping pills, ties his hands and feet, and beats and tortures him, just like he did to her. Meanwhile, Hamza's boss at work comes home to enquire about him. Badru and Shamshu lie that he has gone to the village as his father died, but are unable to get away with it. They tell him that Hamza is sick. Badru starts injecting the shots inside Hamza, which her mother got with the help of Kasim. Hamza escapes by lying to Zulfi, when the women go out to shop. Badru and Shamshu get shocked upon coming home. immediately the police visit to enquire about Hamza missing, as he is a union govt staff. They take doubt about an affair between Zulfi and Badru and try to arrest Zulfi. But Zulfi claims that he is in love with Shamshu. the police are confused and ask them all to come to the station. Shamshu kisses Zulfi and confirms her desire. Hamza has come to the police station, only to tell the police that Badru and her mother are torturing him. The police don't believe his story since he looks drunk. Badru, Shamshu, and Zulfi arrive at the police station to bring him back home. Shamshu and Zulfi suggest they tie Hamza to a railway track to kill him. Badru records a video of Hamza where he mentions he is running away (to indicate he has committed suicide). They tie him to the railway track when Badru realizes that she is turning out to be just like Hamza and unties him just before a train passes by. Hamza now released vows to take revenge on Badru, when he is run over by a train. On the way back home, Shamshu comes clean to Badru that her father also brutally abused the former, even after Badru was born. Shamshu one day too killed Badru's father and took Kasim's help in disposing of the body. She then filed a missing complaint about her husband but the police could never find him. Shamshu assures Badru that she took the correct decision of leaving him for good before he died. Badru also believes that this is the consequence of Hamza's actions. A few days later, they hold a funeral for Hamza. Badru smiles, roams around the city independently happy that she is free now, hoping for a better future.

Cast 
 Alia Bhatt as Badrunissa "Badru" Shaikh (née Ansari) 
 Shefali Shah as Shamshunissa "Shamshu" Ansari, Badru's mother 
 Vijay Varma as Hamza Shaikh, Badru's husband 
 Roshan Mathew as Zulfi, Shamshu's love 
 Vikram Pratap as Abdul, medical store owner  
 Rajesh Sharma as Kasim Kasai
 Vijay Maurya as Inspector Rajaram Tawde
 Santosh Juvekar as Janardhan Jadhav
 Kiran Karmarkar as Ticket Collector Damle, Hamza's boss
Neha Kakkar cameo as a Mumbai performer

Production 
Pre-production started by early January 2021 and the film was planned for 2021 release, itwas announced on behalf of Red Chillies Entertainment through a motion poster by Shah Rukh Khan on March 1, 2021. Set in Mumbai against the backdrop of a conservative lower-middle-class neighborhood, the film was hinted as a story of a quirky mother-daughter duo, sailing through circumstances with courage and love. Also, the motion poster, as a statutory warning translated to: "Offending women can be very injurious to your health". The film marks Alia Bhatt's first production, under the banner Eternal Sunshine Productions'. Apart from Bhatt playing the lead, Shefali Shah was roped in to play the parallel lead, followed by Roshan Mathew and Vijay Varma. Producer Gaurav Verma (Red Chillies Entertainment) mentioned: "Darlings is a move forward in a direction where they would want to collaborate with fresh talent and nurture their perspective." Talking about the casting, the debutante director Jasmeet K. Reen was quoted: "...we have a dream cast and the perfect ‘partners in crime’ if I can call them that. We couldn't have asked for anything more and now I can't wait to get on the floor!" Bhatt added that the film was a powerful story with a lot of humor and doses of dark comedy.

On her character preparation as 'Badru', Bhatt stated, it was picking up authentic sort of lingo of the area in Byculla, Mumbai which was a mixture of Urdu, English, Hindi and Marathi and heard in film dialogues. When she heard the script, she realised it was the time to produce films where she is a pivotal character and with this film, the genre shifted very quickly. Bhatt's character also had an essence from the fable The Scorpion and The Frog, where she added: "...little ambiguous for you to decide that who is the bicchu (scorpion) in the story", and she wanted the audience to actually play with and understand.

In an interview with Outlook Magazine, Mathew stated that the treatment for this role was a trial-and-error attempt, comfortable with his diction in Hindi, where he was clear with expectations of the role in few days of filming. Further interviews by Outlook Magazine wherein Varma hinted on the film story: "It will question what you like and don't like. It's just going to be a roller coaster. Relationships are shown in such a way that you won't know whose side you are going to be after 10 minutes."

In March 2021, Vishal Bhardwaj and Gulzar were onboarded to compose the original songs for the film By June, Bhatt announced she was preparing for the film and shared a photograph on Instagram to acknowledge the script reading.

Filming 
Principal photography commenced with scenes featuring Bhatt and Varma in Mumbai on July 3, 2021. Bhatt shared her monochrome photos from the sets where she was seen sitting in her make-up van, rehearsing. Shah joined the cast in July but wrapped up filming for her scenes by August. September 7, 2021, Bhatt announced that filming was completed and shared a few behind the scenes stills and videos from the shoot.

Marketing
In March 2021, a promotional video and motion logo of the film were released. A teaser poster featuring the official logo of the film was released as well.

In May 2022, Netflix India released a promotional announcement video for the film, featuring the cast. An announcement video revealing the release date for the teaser trailer was released in July 2022. On 5 July 2022, the film's official teaser and two posters were released. On 25 July 2022, the film's official trailer was released; a launch event was held in support of it.

Music 

The film score is composed and produced by Prashant Pillai, while the soundtrack is written by Vishal Bhardwaj and Mellow D with lyrics by Gulzar and the latter.

Zee Music Company released the film's official three-track soundtrack album on 2 August 2022; the lead single "La Ilaaj", sung by Arijit Singh, Vishal Bhardwaj, and Debarpito Saha, was released some hours prior to it.

Release
Darlings was released on 5 August 2022 on Netflix.

Following the acquisition of the film's rights by Netflix in February 2022, Red Chillies Entertainment announced that the film skipped theatrical release, and will digitally premiere as an original on the streaming platform. In July 2022, the film's release date was announced as 5 August 2022.

Reception

Viewership 
Darlings had the highest global opening for a non-English Indian film, with audiences spending more than 10 million hours watching it in its opening weekend, according to a statement released by the streaming service to the BBC.

Critical response 
The review aggregator Rotten Tomatoes reports an approval rating of 76% based on 17 reviews. Darlings received positive reviews with praise towards the storyline and performances of the cast.

Pooja Biraia Jaiswal of The Week awarded 4 out of 5 stars and wrote, "Except for a few instances here and there, Darlings feels as real as can get. You cannot but feel a part of the narrative yourself, when you root for the victim and feel agonised by her misery". Devesh Sharma of Filmfare gave the film 4 out of 5 stars and wrote, "The proceedings take on absurdist hues at times, but that sort of adds to the lure of the film. Watch Darlings for its message and for the fine acting displayed by the entire ensemble class". Tina Das of The Print rated the film 4 out of 5 stars and wrote "Darlings is a dark comedy par excellence, helmed by powerful performances by Alia Bhatt and Shefali Shah". Renuka Vyavahare of Times of India rated the film 3.5 out of 5 stars and wrote, "Darlings makes a compelling case study on domestic violence but it wouldn't be what it is, if it wasn't for Shefali and Alia. Both actresses speak through their eyes and make up for the dreary pace at times with their outstanding performances and chemistry". Umesh Punwani of Koimoi gave the film 3.5 out of 5 stars and wrote, "Darlings is Bollywood getting as close as it could ever be (to date) to Andhadhun. The 'tragedy mein comedy' treatment gives this a soul as Alia Bhatt ends up being the heart of this film". Sukanya Verma of Rediff gave the film 3.5 out of 5 stars and wrote, "Darlings is a well-rounded effort by Jasmeet K. Reen, supported by bold ideas and clever imagery". Pratikshya Mishra of The Quint awarded the film a score of 3.5 out of 5 stars and wrote, "Satire is a tough tool and Darlings wields it well. Even though sometimes the satire might not translate and the pacing might wobble, the pros heavily outweigh the cons". Film critic based at Bollywood Hungama gave the film 3.5 out of 5 stars and wrote, "Darlings is a hilarious entertainer and at the same time, it is also replete with some hard-hitting moments. The performances of Alia Bhatt, Shefali Shah and Vijay Varma are award-winning and serve as the icing on the cake". Fengyen Chiu of Mashable awarded the film a score of 3.5 out of 5 stars and wrote, "Domestic violence has been depicted in several Bollywood movie before, but Darlings has done it in a very creative and fresh way. Some aspects of the plot were indeed predictable, but some aspects also catch you off guard. All-in Alia Bhatt and Shefali Shah is definitely a must watch and will make you cry, angry, frustrated, and happy throughout the movie". Shilajit Mitra of The New Indian Express rated the film 3.5 out of 5 stars and wrote "Darlings entices and thrills, even if I wish the film had gone all out. I wish it had killed its darlings". Avinash Lohana of Pinkvilla rated the film 3.5 out of 5 stars and wrote "Darlings stays consistent even in the second half, and a few high points scattered periodically in the script keeps you hooked to the narrative. Watch it for the message and the performances".

Saibal Chatterjee of NDTV gave the film 3 out of 5 stars and wrote, "Darlings, which ploughs a dark furrow all its own while making judicious use of genre elements while shunning standard narrative tropes, is watchable all the way". Namrata Joshi of The National Herald wrote, "The cast of Darlings makes it a riveting watch. Varma is terrifying and Roshan Mathew as believable as the tender man. Ultimately, it's all in the hands of the forever solid & reliable Shah and Bhatt, matching her in every beat". Anupama Chopra of Film Companion wrote, "Darlings is very much its own film. There is generosity of spirit, which makes it eminently watchable". Tushar Joshi of India Today awarded the film 3 stars (out of 5) and wrote, "Darlings is a film with a message. It touches upon the subject of domestic violence and addiction. Alia and Shefali's timing and Vijay Varma's acting save Darlings from becoming just another film with a social message". Bohni Bandyopadhyay of CNN-IBN gave the film 3 out of 5 stars and wrote, "Alia Bhatt, Shefali Shah and Vijay Varma's black comedy brings out laughs in tragic situations, but is ultimately a story about shattered hopes and dreams".

Nandini Ramnath of Scroll wrote, "Darlings has both laugh-out-loud comedy and suppressed giggles. Reen's control over the lengthier sequences, backed by Anil Mehta's sinuous camerawork and Nitin Baid's elegant editing, is strongest when Hamza drops the mask and lets the misogyny show". Shubhra Gupta of The Indian Express rated the film 2.5 out of 5 stars and wrote "Alia Bhatt, Vijay Varma, Shefali Shah and Roshan Mathew deliver excellent performances in a film that is aware of what it is. A few forced comic touches spoil the effect though". Anna M.M. Vetticad of Firstpost rated the film 2.5 out of 5 stars and wrote "This clarity and a certain energy are missing for the most part from the rest of Darlings. Full marks to the squad for risk-taking. On the execution front though, it barely gets a passing grade". Published Palestinian Bollywood writer, Ahmad Rashad Arafa, called the film "stridently fresh and refreshingly measured" singling out the film's "ability to gently swing from sanskar toxicity to pragmatist emancipation."

References

External links 
 

2022 films
2020s Hindi-language films
2022 thriller films
2022 comedy-drama films
Hindi-language Netflix original films
Indian mystery thriller films
Indian direct-to-video films
2022 direct-to-video films